Off! (stylized as OFF!) is an insect repellent brand from S. C. Johnson & Son, produced in Finland. Its active ingredient is DEET (N,N-diethyl-m-toluamide) or metofluthrin which is the most common ingredient in insect repellants. It was first sold in 1957.

It is used to avoid mosquito bites by applying the product to the skin or clothing. In Japan and North Korean markets, the product was sold as Skinguard.

The company has since sold its product on the North Korean market for the first time since 1999.

References

External links 
 

S. C. Johnson & Son brands
Insect repellents
Products introduced in 1957